Marine Corps Outlying Field Atlantic is a military airport of the United States Marine Corps located in Atlantic, North Carolina. It is operated as a training field by Marine Corps Air Station Cherry Point.

Footnotes

External links
  Abandoned & Little-Known Airfields: Atlantic Marine Corps Outer Landing Field (12NC)
 

Airports in North Carolina
Buildings and structures in Carteret County, North Carolina
Military installations in North Carolina
United States Marine Corps air stations